Nowkar-e Gazi (also Romanized as Nowkār-e Gazī and Now Kārgazī; also known as Naukāl Gazi, Nowkāl-e Gazī, and Shīf Nowkāl-e Gazī) is a village in Angali Rural District, in the Central District of Bushehr County, Bushehr Province, Iran. At the 2006 census, its population was 102, in 22 families.

References 

Populated places in Bushehr County